Harriet Elizabeth Prescott Spofford (April 3, 1835 – August 14, 1921) was an American writer of novels, poems and detective stories. One of the United States's most widely-published authors, her career spanned more than six decades and included many literary genres, such as short stories, poems, novels, literary criticism, biographies, and memoirs. She also wrote articles on household decorative art and travel as well as children's literature.

Early years and education
Harriet Elizabeth Prescott was born in Calais, Maine, on April 3, 1835, the eldest daughter of Joseph N. Prescott and Sarah Bridges.
 When Harriet was still very young, the family removed to Newburyport, Massachusetts, which was ever after her home, though she spent many of her winters in Boston and Washington, D.C. Her early environments were characterized by picturesque scenery on the one hand, and sturdy New England teachings on the other, which would later affect the themes and vision of her writing.
Many notable people were allied with the Prescott family, notably Sir William Pepperrell, John Brydges, 1st Baron Chandos, and the historian, William H. Prescott, while more recently, Secretary of State, William M. Evarts and the Hoar brothers, Ebenezer and George.

Her father, Joseph N. Prescott, was then a lumber merchant in Calais; afterward he studied and practised law. In 1849, he became attracted by the Pacific coast, and, leaving his family in their Maine home, went out among the host of California Gold Rush pioneers to seek his fortune. He was one of the founders of Oregon City, Oregon, and three times elected its mayor. In the midst of arduous work, he was seized with lingering paralysis, that made him an invalid for life.

At fourteen years of age, she moved to her aunt's home, Mrs. Betton, for better educational opportunities, and entered the Putnam Free School in Newburyport, which had the reputation of turning out many accomplished scholars. Here, she also made herself famous among her schoolmates by writing dramas for their use on days of school exhibition; for these plays, she used historic facts and vivid language. At the age of seventeen, she gained the Putnam school prize for the best essay on Hamlet, which drew the attention of Thomas Wentworth Higginson, pastor of the Unitarian Church, who soon became her friend, and gave her counsel and encouragement. About this time, Mrs. Prescott, with her younger children, moved to Derry, New Hampshire, and after Spofford had graduated at the Putnam School, she finished her education at Pinkerton Academy, from 1853 to 1855.

Career
After graduation at the age of seventeen, a family misfortune occurred. As the eldest of the family, the entire responsibility of financial support fell upon her. The father had been stricken with paralysis, and her mother became a confirmed invalid. Soon after, her first published story appeared, and, being asked for others, she supplied one hundred during the next three years. She besieged the story paper offices of Boston with sketches and novelettes. The competition was not so great then as it later become, but it required almost incessant work —sometimes wrote for fifteen hours a day— to cover the expenses of the family. Her stories of those days she were never collected or acknowledged. 

Her wide reputation was acquired almost at a stroke. In 1859, she sent to the Atlantic Monthly a story entitled "In a Cellar." James Russell Lowell was at that time editor of the Atlantic and at first declined to believe that any young lady could have written such a brilliant and characteristic description of Bohemian Parisian life; he insisted that it must be a translation from the French. The endorsement of the Atlantic opened all other U.S. magazine offices to its writers, allowing her to become a welcome contributor to the chief periodicals of the country, both in prose and poetry.

Her first novel, Sir Rohan's Ghost, published in 1859 in Boston, was a very striking work that showed her talent for skillful plot and effective dramatic denouement, as well as a few flaws, e.g., a crudeness of thought and expression apparent, that she overcame as she gained experience. This book was reviewed at some length in the Crayon, an art journal then published in New York City.

Spofford's later works were: The Amber Gods and Other Stories, published in Boston, 1863; Azarim, in 1864; New England Legends, in 1871; The Thief in the Night, in 1872; Art Decoration Applied to Furniture, published in New York in 1881; Marquis of Carabas, Boston, 1872; Hester Stanley at St. Mark's, 1883 ; The Servant Girl Question, 1884; and Ballads about Authors, 1888. In addition to Spofford's prolific prose, she wrote poems and ballads.

Style and reception
Spofford's fiction had very little in common with what was regarded as representative of the New England mind. Her gothic romances were set apart by luxuriant descriptions, and an unconventional handling of female stereotypes of the day. Her writing was ideal, intense in feeling. In her descriptions and fancies, she reveled in sensuous delights and every variety of splendor. In style, Spofford was chaste and classical. She did not aim at sensationalism, and throughout her writings an air of peace and purity reigned. She exhibited an extraordinary affluence of language, which never appeared to be strained or affected.

When Higginson asked Emily Dickinson whether she had read Spofford's work "Circumstance", Dickinson replied, "I read Miss Prescott's 'Circumstance,' but it followed me in the dark, so I avoided her."

Personal life

In 1865, after many years of engagement, she married Richard S. Spofford (died 1888), a Boston lawyer, and son of Dr. R. S. Spofford, a physician of Essex County; he was also cousin to Ainsworth Rand Spofford, the librarian of the Congressional library in Washington, D. C. In her second year of marriage, a child was born, a son, who died in infancy.

The Spoffords lived on Deer Island overlooking the Merrimack River at Amesbury. Though the entire island was purchased for a permanent home, she spent many of her winters, or a portion of them, in Boston and Washington. Spofford's mother, Mrs. Prescott, died April 1, 1883, at Deer Island, in her daughter's home. Spofford died at Deer Island on August 14, 1921.

Selected works 

 Sir Rohan's Ghost, 1860
 The Amber Gods, and Other Stories, 1863, republished 1989
 Azarian: An Episode, 1864
 New England Legends, 1871
 The Thief in the Night, 1872
 Art Decoration Applied to Furniture, 1878
 The Servant Girl Question, 1881
 Marquis of Carabas, 1882
 Poems, 1882
 Hester Stanley at St. Mark's, 1883
 Ballads About Authors, 1887
 A Scarlet Poppy, and Other Stories, 1894
 Stepping Stones To Happiness, 1897
 Old Madame, and Other Tragedies, 1900
  That Betty, 1903
 The Ray of Displacement and other stories, 1903
 Old Washington, 1906
 The Fairy Changeling, 1910
 A Little Book of Friends, 1916
 The Elder's People, 1920

Further reading 
 "The Amber Gods," and Other Stories, edited with an introduction by Alfred Bendixen. New Brunswick: Rutgers University Press, 1989.
 Different works of hers at Project Gutenberg Australia: http://gutenberg.net.au/ebooks06/0606581.txt
 The Moonstone Mass and Others edited by Jessica Amanda Salmonson (Ash-Tree Press, 2000) a selection of Spofford's best ghost stories with an informative introduction by Salmonson.

References

Attribution

Bibliography

External links

 
 
 
 
 
 Harriet Elizabeth Prescott Spofford papers at the Mortimer Rare Book Collection, Smith College Special Collections

1835 births
1921 deaths
19th-century American novelists
19th-century American women writers
20th-century American novelists
20th-century American women writers
20th-century American poets
American mystery writers
American women novelists
People from Calais, Maine
Writers from Newburyport, Massachusetts
Novelists from Maine
American women poets
Women mystery writers
Novelists from Massachusetts
American women short story writers
Pinkerton Academy alumni